Ray Fisher (born September 8, 1987) is an American actor. He is known for his portrayal of the superhero Victor Stone / Cyborg in the DC Extended Universe media franchise, first appearing in a cameo in the film Batman v Superman: Dawn of Justice (2016) and then in a lead role in the films Justice League (2017) and its 2021 director's cut. In television, he played roles in the third season of the crime drama series True Detective and the limited series Women of the Movement. He made his Broadway debut in the 2022 revival of the play The Piano Lesson.

Early life and education
Fisher was born on September 8, 1987, in Baltimore, Maryland. He grew up in Lawnside, New Jersey, where he was raised by his mother and grandmother. Fisher attended Haddon Heights High School. He worked at the concession stand of the Cinemark theater in Somerdale during this time. Fisher became involved in musical theatre through his high school English and history teachers. His first stage performances were in productions of the musicals Into the Woods,  How to Succeed in Business Without Really Trying, and Guys and Dolls. Fisher attended the American Musical and Dramatic Academy.

Career
In 2008, Fisher portrayed Dr. Marcus Blake in the musical Attorney for the Damned, which held performances at the off-off-Broadway Kraine Theater. The following year, he acted in William Shakespeare's play Macbeth at the Shakespeare Theatre of New Jersey in Madison, New Jersey at Drew University. Fisher played a minor role in the 2010 McCarter Theatre Center production of Will Power's play Fetch Clay, Make Man. He performed as part of the Shakespeare Theatre of New Jersey, where he starred in a production of the play To Kill a Mockingbird. He also performed in the Oregon Shakespeare Festival's productions of the plays King Lear and Cymbeline. Fisher portrayed boxer Muhammad Ali in the 2013 off-Broadway production of the play Fetch Clay, Make Man at the New York Theatre Workshop in New York City, gaining 20 pounds of muscle and going from 193 to 212 pounds. To prepare for the role, he stated that he "had to lift—bench presses, curls, squats, calf raises" and "get used to a new body".

Fisher had a cameo appearance as the superhero Victor Stone / Cyborg in the 2016 superhero film Batman v Superman: Dawn of Justice. The character was the first black superhero in the DC Extended Universe media franchise. He reprised the role as part of an ensemble cast in Justice League (2017), which generated lukewarm reviews and had an unsuccessful theatrical run. 

In 2020, Fisher accused director Joss Whedon of "abusive" and "unprofessional" behavior while filming Justice League. He also called DC Films executive Walter Hamada "the most dangerous kind of enabler" and stated that he "will not participate in any production associated with [Hamada]" in December 2020. While he was slated to appear in the film The Flash, Fisher stated in January 2021 that he had been removed from the film due to Hamada's involvement. He reprised the role of Cyborg in Zack Snyder's Justice League, the 2021 director's cut of Justice League. Fisher participated in the filming of new footage for the cut in October 2020. Reviewing the cut, Tom Jorgensen of IGN highlighted Fisher's nuanced and colorful portrayal and Alex Abad-Santos of Vox praised the "mix of rage and vulnerability" in his performance.

Fisher starred in the third season of the anthology crime drama series True Detective, which aired in 2019 on HBO. He portrayed Gene Mobley, the husband of activist Mamie Till-Mobley, in the ABC limited series Women of the Movement. Fisher is set to play Blood Axe, a warrior in the fantasy film Rebel Moon, reuniting with Zack Snyder, who is set to direct the film, following working together on Justice League. In 2022, he made his Broadway debut as Lymon in a revival of the play The Piano Lesson by August Wilson.

Filmography

Theatre

References

External links
 

1987 births
Living people
21st-century American male actors
African-American male actors
American male film actors
American male stage actors
American male Shakespearean actors
Haddon Heights Junior/Senior High School alumni
Male actors from New Jersey
People from Lawnside, New Jersey
Twitch (service) streamers
American Musical and Dramatic Academy alumni